Valüna is a valley area in Liechtenstein located in the municipality of Triesen.

References

Villages of Liechtenstein